Friday the 13th: The Final Chapter  is a 1984 American slasher film directed by Joseph Zito, produced by Frank Mancuso Jr., and starring Kimberly Beck, Corey Feldman, Crispin Glover, and Peter Barton. It is the sequel to Friday the 13th Part III (1982) and the fourth installment in the Friday the 13th franchise. Picking up immediately after the events of the previous film, the plot follows a presumed-dead Jason Voorhees who escapes from the morgue and returns to Crystal Lake to continue his killing spree. The film marks the debut of the character Tommy Jarvis (Feldman), who would make further appearances in two sequels and related media, establishing him as Jason's archenemy.

Much like Part III, the film was originally supposed to be the final installment in the series. Mancuso Jr. wanted to conclude the series as he felt no one respected him for his producing work on it regardless of how much the films earned at the box office, while also wanting to work on other projects. Paramount Pictures supported the decision, as they were aware of the declining popularity of slasher films at the time of its release. As a result, the film was marketed as "The Final Chapter" to ensure it as such. Make-up artist Tom Savini, who worked on the first film, returned because he wanted to help kill off Jason, whom he helped create.

The film was originally scheduled to be released in October but was pushed up to April 13, 1984. Upon its theatrical release, the film grossed $33 million in the U.S. on a budget of $2.2 million, making it the fourth most attended of the Friday the 13th series with approximately 9,815,700 tickets sold. Though the film received generally negative reviews from critics at the time of release, it has retrospectively come to be considered one of the stronger entries in the series. Despite being billed as the final film, its success prompted another sequel, Friday the 13th: A New Beginning, one year later, followed by a further six sequels and a reboot.

Plot
The night after the events of the previous film, police clean up the grounds, and Jason Voorhees' body, believed to be dead, is taken to the morgue. Jason spontaneously revives and escapes from the cold storage at the hospital, murdering the coroner Axel Burns with a hacksaw and gutting Nurse Robbie Morgan with a scalpel. The following day, a group of teenagers drives to Crystal Lake for the weekend. The group consists of Paul, his girlfriend Sam, virgin Sara, her boyfriend Doug, awkward Jimmy, and jokester Ted. On the way, the group comes across Pamela Voorhees' tombstone and a hitchhiker, who Jason soon kills.

The teens arrive and meet neighbors Trish Jarvis, her twelve-year-old brother Tommy, and the family dog Gordon. While going for a walk the next day, the teens meet twin sisters Tina and Terri and go skinny dipping with them. Trish and Tommy happen upon the scene, and Trish is invited to a party taking place that night. Afterward, when their car breaks down, Trish and Tommy are helped out by a young man named Rob Dier. They take him to their house, where he meets their mother. Tommy shows him several monster masks he made before Rob leaves to go camping.

Later that night, the teens begin the party. A jealous Sam sees Tina flirting with Paul and leaves. She goes out to the lake, where Jason impales her from under a raft with a machete. When Paul goes out to look for her, he is harpooned in the groin. Terri tries to leave the party early, but Jason stabs her with a spear before she can get on her bike. Mrs. Jarvis arrives home and discovers the power outage. While searching for her children and Gordon, she is killed offscreen. Trish and Tommy soon arrive and realize their mother is missing. Trish goes to search for her and finds Rob's campsite. It is revealed that Rob is the brother of Sandra Dier from the second installment. Rob further explains to her that Jason is still alive and that he came to Crystal Lake to avenge his sister's death. Worried about Tommy's safety, Trish and Rob return to the house.

After sleeping with Tina, Jimmy goes downstairs to get a bottle of wine. Jason pins his hand with a corkscrew before striking his face with a meat cleaver. Tina looks out a window upstairs and finds that her sister's bike is still there. Jason then bursts through the window and throws her to her death, crashing into the car. While a stoned Ted watches stag films with a film projector, he gets too close to the projector screen and is stabbed in the head with a kitchen knife from the other side. Jason then goes upstairs, where Doug and Sara finish making love in the shower. After Sara leaves, Jason kills Doug by crushing his head against the shower tile. When Sara screams upon finding Doug's body, she tries to escape but gets a double-bit axe through her chest.

Trish, Rob, and Gordon go next door to investigate and discover the teens' bodies. Gordon flees, and Jason kills Rob in the basement as Trish runs home, taking Rob's machete. She and Tommy barricade the house, but Jason breaks in and chases them into Tommy's room. Trish lures Jason out of the house and escapes, then returns home and is devastated to learn that Tommy did not run away. She senses Jason behind her and tries to fight him off with the machete but is overpowered. Having disguised himself to look like Jason as a child, Tommy distracts him long enough for Trish to hit him with the machete, but she merely whacks off his mask. As Trish stands horrified at Jason's deformed face, Tommy takes the machete and strikes it in the side of his skull, causing him to collapse to the floor and split his head upon impact. When Tommy notices that Jason's fingers are slightly moving, he continues to hack at his body, yelling, "Die! Die! Die!" while Trish repeatedly yells out his name.

At the hospital, Tommy visits Trish. He rushes in, embraces her, and gives a disturbed look while staring into the camera.

Cast

 Ted White as Jason Voorhees
 Corey Feldman as Tommy Jarvis
 Kimberly Beck as Trish Jarvis
 E. Erich Anderson as Rob Dier
 Crispin Glover as Jimmy
 Alan Hayes as Paul
 Barbara Howard as Sara
 Joan Freeman as Tracy Jarvis 
 Peter Barton as Doug
 Judie Aronson as Samantha
 Camilla and Carey More as Tina and Terri
 Lawrence Monoson as Ted
 Bruce Mahler as Axel Burns
 Lisa Freeman as Nurse Robbie Morgan
 Bonnie Hellman as Hitchhiker

Production
When Friday the 13th Part III was released, it was initially supposed to end the series as a trilogy, but there was no moniker to indicate it as such. In 1983, there were rumors that Paramount Pictures billed the fourth film as "The Final Chapter" as a result of them feeling embarrassed by their association with the series. Despite how Roger Ebert and Gene Siskel claimed this in their review of the film on At the Movies, Paramount Pictures was aware that the slasher genre had been declining in interest. However, the idea came from producer Frank Mancuso, Jr. (the son of Paramount CEO Frank Mancuso, Sr.) as he began to resent the series due to how he felt nobody respected him for working on Friday the 13th Part 2 as a production assistant and Part III as producer, regardless of how much money the films earned. As a result of this and him wanting to work on different projects, he wanted to conclude the series by killing off Jason.

Writing
The filmmakers wanted Joseph Zito, who had previously produced and directed The Prowler, to direct and write the screenplay for the film. He initially claimed that he wasn't a writer, but he later accepted it when the contract offered him payment for directing and writing. Zito secretly used the extra salary to hire Barney Cohen to write the script. Their process entailed Zito taking one-hour phone calls every night with Phil Scuderi to discuss the film's screenplay and story. He then met Cohen in a New York apartment to use the ideas Scuderi had offered, which then they would turn into script pages sent that day to Scuderi in Boston to be discussed again over the phone. Cohen remained credited for writing the film, but he eventually got into trouble with the Writers Guild of America as a result.

Previous Friday the 13th films generally favored young women being the final girl. This is the first film in the series to not only have two survivors instead of one, but one of them being a child. The filmmakers believed this aspect has never been done before in a slasher film, as well as them wanting to create characters that the audience don't want to see harmed or killed. By including the Jarvis family (a divorced mother, a teenage daughter, and a pre-teen son) opposite the usual cast of teenagers, they could generate more drama and resonant tragedy such the implication of Mrs. Jarvis killed outside by Jason, and thus remaining debatable how intentional the parallels are between Jason and Tommy. Tommy's interest in make-up effects served as an homage to Tom Savini.

Casting
Camilla More initially auditioned for Samantha, but when the filmmakers discovered she had a twin sister they were instead offered the roles of Tina and Terri. Amy Steel, who starred as heroine Ginny Field in Friday the 13th Part 2, co-starred with Peter Barton on the TV series The Powers of Matthew Star. Barton was offered the role of Doug when the series was cancelled, but he was initially reluctant as he wanted no part in any horror film, especially after he disliked working on Hell Night. However, because Steel was involved in Part 2, she talked him into doing the film.

Make-up artist Tom Savini, who had not returned for Part 2 and Part III, was invited by Zito to work on the film to help kill off Jason, who he helped create in the original film.

Filming
Filming commenced in October 1983 to January 1984 in Topanga Canyon and Newhall, California. It was originally set to be released in October 1984, but Frank Mancuso, Sr. pushed the release date to April 13, leaving them only 6 weeks to complete post-production. The only time Paramount helped with the film's production, they rented a house in Malibu for the filmmakers to stay and conduct editing sessions, with food brought to them by the studio.

An alternative ending exists where the character of Trish discovers the body of Mrs. Jarvis in the bathtub. This exists as a DVD extra but the original audio for the scene is lost.

Music

The film's music was composed by Harry Manfredini, who composed the scores to all of the series' previous installments. On January 13, 2012, La-La Land Records released a limited edition 6-CD boxset containing Manfredini's scores from the first six entries of the film series. The release was sold out in less than 24 hours of availability.

The song "Love Is a Lie" by Lion is featured in the film, but not on the soundtrack.

Reception

Box office
Friday the 13th: The Final Chapter opened on Friday, April 13, 1984, on 1,594 screens and grossed $11.1 million in its opening weekend, ranking number one at the box office. The film would ultimately take in $33 million at the U.S. box office, placing number 26 on the list of the year's top-grossing films.

Critical response
On the review aggregator website Rotten Tomatoes, Friday the 13th: The Final Chapter holds an approval rating of 22% based on 32 reviews, with an average rating of 4.2/10. The site's critics consensus reads: "As lumberingly single-minded as its homicidal star, Friday the 13th – The Final Chapter adds another rote entry to an increasingly labored franchise." On Metacritic, it has a weighted average score of 33 out of 100, based on seven critics, indicating "generally unfavorable reviews."

Roger Ebert and Gene Siskel berated the film on their show, with the former deeming it "an immoral and reprehensible piece of trash." Scott Meslow summarized Ebert's criticism as calling it "a cynical retread" of the earlier films, noting that the film instead attempts to kill off the series while focusing more on characterization than gore.  In a series retrospective, Kyle Anderson of Entertainment Weekly ranked it the best Friday the 13th film, complimenting both its narrative and kills.

References

External links

 
 
 
 
 Film page at the Camp Crystal Lake web site
 Film page at Fridaythe13thfilms.com
 

1980s serial killer films
Friday Part 4
1984 films
Friday the 13th Part 04: The Final Chapter
American sequel films
American serial killer films
American slasher films
Films about families
Films directed by Joseph Zito
Films scored by Harry Manfredini
Films set in 1984
Films set in New Jersey
Films shot in California
4
Paramount Pictures films
1980s English-language films
1980s American films